The clasico kabylo-algérois is the name given to matches between USM Alger and JS Kabylie football clubs from  Tizi Ouzou and Algiers, Algeria they are considered one of the most famous clubs in Algeria and their matches are given great attention by the Algerian media, The period between 1996 and 2010 is the most exciting between the two teams because of the great conflict between the heads of the two teams Saïd Allik and Mohand Chérif Hannachi, It is said that the reason for the enmity between the two when Said Alik bringing the star of JS Kabylie and national team at the time Mahieddine Meftah the two teams were both champions and runners-up in the same season five times, including three consecutive times between 2003–04 and 2005–06.

History

Early years
The clasico USM Alger and JS Kabylie are among the oldest teams in Algeria. The first meeting between the two teams was during the period of colonization in the Second division and ended with JS Kabylie victory 5–2 after which the two teams did not meet again until the independence of Algeria, in the first league match of the 1963–64 season, USM Alger won 3–2.after that fell the JS Kabylie team to the third division the same thing for the USM Alger in the next season fell to the second division, but beginning in the seventies the difference in the level between them became large from 1970 to 1982 USM Alger did not achieve any victory against JS Kabylie in the league in 20 meeting only in the Algerian Cup twice in this period, JS Kabylie achieved seven titles between the League, the Cup and the African Cup of Champions Clubs, while the USM Alger have won a single title in the cup. From 1983 to 1990 the matches between the two teams were not equal and the heaviest result between the two teams was in 1988–89 season at Stade du 1er-Novembre-1954 and ended 7–1 Then USM Alger fell to the second division for five seasons and the first meeting between the two teams after the return ended in favor of the USM Alger for a single goal and this time the level between the two teams has become equal and at the end of the season achieved the league title.

In 1977 a sports reform was carried out as intended by the Ministry of Youth and Sports, in order to give the elite clubs a good financial base allowing them to structure themselves professionally (in ASP Which means Association Sportive de Performances). The aim was therefore that they should have full management autonomy with the creation of their own training center. JS Kabylie change of its name which becomes Jeunesse Electronique de Tizi-Ouzou (JET). as for USM Alger sponsors the club and change the name to Union sportive kahraba d'Alger (USK Alger), meaning electricity who had inherited the Société nationale de l'électricité et du gaz company (Sonelgaz).

On 1 July 1999, the two teams met for the first time in the final of the Algerian Cup at Stade 5 Juillet 1962 and in the first final to be attended by the new president of the country Abdelaziz Bouteflika and ended with the victory of USM Alger with two goals record by Billel Dziri and the former player in JS Kabylie Tarek Hadj Adlane To be the fourth Cup of USMA as for JS Kabylie is the second title lost in a month after being defeated in the Final league against MC Alger, With the start of the millennium JS Kabylie achieved three consecutive titles in the CAF Cup 2000, 2001 and 2002 at the same time, the competition between the two teams increased, especially in the league between 2002 and 2008, in the 2005–06 season in the first leg between the two teams in Tizi Ouzou and after the end of the first half JS Kabylie advanced with a single goal. USM Alger refused to complete the second half on the pretext of attacking the players of the team, including Billel Dziri, who said he was stabbed with a white weapon. it turned out that what looked like blood was nothing else Merbromin. To punish the team with a 3-0 loss contributed to the loss of the league title at the end of the season by a single point after deducting three points from his balance. where each team won the league three times, and met the two teams for the second time in the Cup final and also ended with the victory of les Usmistes on penalties.

Second professional era (since 2010)

It was decided by the Ligue de Football Professionnel and the Algerian Football Federation to professionalize the Algerian football championship, starting from the 2010–11 season Thus all the Algerian football clubs which until then enjoyed the status of semi-professional club, will acquire the professional appointment this season. the president of the Algerian Football Federation, Mohamed Raouraoua, has been speaking since his inauguration as the federation's president in Professionalism, USM Alger become the first professional club in Algeria businessman Ali Haddad became the majority share owner after investing 700 million Algeria dinars to buy an 83% ownership in the club. On October 27, 2010, Haddad replaced Saïd Allik as president of the club. Allik had been the club's president for the past 18 years, USMA Club became more powerful team of JS Kabylie because of the huge money that has become, since the beginning of the era of professionalism in 2010 to 2017, the USMA has achieved 6 titles, while JS Kabylie won only one title, the Algerian Cup in 2011 and in the 2013–14 season JSK achieved the first victory against USM Alger in the Algerian Cup on penalties.

On June 2, 2019, it is official, the Haddad family is selling its 92% shareholding in SSPA USMA. It was the club's communication officer, Amine Tirmane, who announced it on the Echourouk TV. the reasons that made them make this decision is the imprisonment of club owner Ali Haddad and also freeze all financial accounts of the club. After it was expected that the USM Alger general assembly of shareholders will be on March 12, 2020, it was submitted to March 2, especially after the imprisonment of the former club president, Rabouh Haddad. The meeting witnessed the attendance of ETRHB Haddad representative and the absence of the amateur club president Saïd Allik, and after two and a half hours, it was announced that Groupe SERPORT had bought the shares of ETRHB Haddad which amounted to 94.34%.

On November 29, 2022, Djaffar Ait Mouloud president of the Club sportif amateur (CSA) which owns JS Kabylie, has announced an agreement with the public company ATM Mobilis for the purchase of 80% of the club's shares.

Albert Ebossé Death

On 23 August 2014, during the second day of the championship, the JS Kabylie bowed 2-1 to the USM Alger despite a goal Albert Ebossé to penalty to 27th minute. After the match, as he prepares to return to the locker room, Albert Ebossé receives on his head a stone thrown from the stands and died in hospital as a result of a Traumatic brain injury. The same day, the Minister of the Algerian Interior Tayeb Belaiz requesting an investigation! therefore, the Professional Football League ordered the closure of the Stade 1er Novembre 1954 until further notice. The next day, Federation postpones games scheduled on 29 and 30 August 2014 to make tribute to Albert Ebossé player who died and protest against the Quote irresponsible actions of some fanatics and hooligans that sustain violence in stadiums and has reached unacceptable proportions. in addition, the club agrees to pay compensation of 100000 dollars and the player's salary to the family Ebossé. the first witnesses cite bleeding either the carotid or the skull, which resulted in a hemorrhagic shock fatal. The pathologist who performed the autopsy notes a Traumatic brain injury and a wound (hemorrhagic) to the skull. These elements suggest the conclusion that stoning is the direct cause of death. But no one disputes that the projectiles were thrown from the stands supporters of JSK, which aggravates the responsibility of the club in any way responsible for the overall security of the stadium and surrounding areas. On 25 August 2014, the president of JSK, Mohand Chérif Hannachi states that according to doctors of the club, Albert Ebossé died of a heart attack caused by a Malay and not a Traumatic brain injury, mainly because of the efforts made during the high-level game. This suggests that death would be coincidental and unrelated incidents and liabilityclub. finally, one day after his death, Parquet of Tizi Ouzou says the autopsy proved that the player was killed by projectilequestion.

All-time head-to-head results

All-Time Top Scorers

Hat-tricks
A hat-trick is achieved when the same player scores three or more goals in one match. Listed in chronological order.

All-Time Top appearances
Bold Still playing competitive football in Algeria
since 2000–01 season.
Statistics correct as of game on 3 February 2022

Honours

League matches

Algerian Cup results

League Cup results

Shared player history

Players who have played for both clubs

  Mehdi Cerbah (USM Alger 1970–72, JS Kabylie 1972–80)
  Tarek Hadj Adlane (USM Alger 1985–91 & 1996–99 & 2000–2002, JS Kabylie 1991–96)
  Mohamed Amine Aoudia (JS Kabylie 2009–10, USM Alger 2015–16)
  Karim Baïteche (USM Alger 2012–16, JS Kabylie 2017)
  Farouk Belkaïd (JS Kabylie 1998–2005, USM Alger 2005–2006)
  Farid Belmellat (JS Kabylie 1991–92, USM Alger 1993–94 & 1996–2000 & 2004–07)
  Adlène Bensaïd (USM Alger 2006, JS Kabylie 2007–09)
  Mourad Berrefane (JS Kabylie 2006–2011, USM Alger 2014–19)
  Yacine Bezzaz (JS Kabylie 2001–2002, USM Alger 2011)
  Mohamed Boussefiane (USM Alger 2005–09, JS Kabylie 2009)
  Kamel Marek (JS Kabylie 2005–07, USM Alger 2007–08)
  Adel Maïza (USM Alger 2012, JS Kabylie 2013)
  Sofiane Harkat (JS Kabylie 2005–08, USM Alger 2009–10)
  Salim Hanifi (JS Kabylie 2011–13, USM Alger 2013)
  Farès Hamiti (JS Kabylie 2009–11, USM Alger 2011–12)
  Noureddine Daham (JS Kabylie 2002–03, USM Alger 2009–13)
  Mahieddine Meftah (JS Kabylie 1987–96, USM Alger 1996–07)
  Mohamed Rabie Meftah (JS Kabylie 2004–10, USM Alger 2011–20)
  Rahim Meftah (JS Kabylie 1999–2007, USM Alger 2007–08)
  Zineddine Mekkaoui (USM Alger 2004–10, JS Kabylie 2012–15)
  Djamel Menad (JS Kabylie 1981–87 & 1994–96, USM Alger 1996–97)
  Hocine Metref (USM Alger 2002–08, JS Kabylie 2011–12)
  Lahcène Nazef (JS Kabylie 1997–2002, USM Alger 2003–05)
  Hocine El Orfi (JS Kabylie 2010–12, USM Alger 2012–16)
  Moncef Ouichaoui (USM Alger 2000–01 & 2002–04, JS Kabylie 2004)
  Nouri Ouznadji (JS Kabylie 2008–09, USM Alger 2009–12)
  Saâdi Radouani (USM Alger 2015–16 & 2020–, JS Kabylie 2017–18)
  Ali Rial (USM Alger 2007–10, JS Kabylie 2010–17)
  Mohamed Seguer (JS Kabylie 2010, USM Alger 2012–16)
  Saad Tedjar <(JS Kabylie 2009–12, USM Alger 2012–13)
  Hamza Yacef (USM Alger 1997–2001, JS Kabylie 2005–07)
  Nassim Yettou (USM Alger 2011–13, JS Kabylie 2016–18)
  Mehdi Benaldjia (USM Alger 2009–14, JS Kabylie 2017–18)
  Oussama Benbot <(JS Kabylie 2018–21, USM Alger 2021–)

Coaches who managed both clubs

  Abdelaziz Ben Tifour (USM Alger 1962–65 & 1967–68, JS Kabylie 1970–71)
  Meziane Ighil (JS Kabylie 2011–12, USM Alger 2012)
  Azzedine Aït Djoudi (USM Alger 2002–03, JS Kabylie 2003–04 & 2006–07 & 2013–14 & 2017)
  Kamel Mouassa (JS Kabylie 1997–99 & 2001–02 & 2004 & 2016, USM Alger 2009)
  Noureddine Saâdi (JS Kabylie 1992–94 & 2018, USM Alger 1996–97 & 2000–02 & 2004–05 & 2009–10)
  Nour Benzekri (JS Kabylie 1991–92, USM Alger 1995–96 & 1999)
  Ali Benfadah (JS Kabylie 1967–69, USM Alger 1980–82 & 1990 & 1992)
  Rachid Belhout (USM Alger 2007, JS Kabylie 2010–11)
  Younès Ifticen (USM Alger 1994–95 & 1997–98, JS Kabylie 2008–09)
  Hubert Velud (USM Alger 2013–15, JS Kabylie 2019–20)

Algerian Ligue Professionnelle 1 results

The tables list the place each team took in each of the seasons.

Gallery

Notes

References

USM Alger
JS Kabylie
Football rivalries in Algeria